The men's shot put event at the 1955 Pan American Games was held at the Estadio Universitario in Mexico City on 14 March.

Results

References

Athletics at the 1955 Pan American Games
1955